Sarrià is a railway station located under the Via Augusta at Carrer de l'Hort de la Vila in the Sarrià neighbourhood of the Sarrià-Sant Gervasi district of Barcelona. It is served by lines L6 and L12 of the Barcelona Metro, and by lines S1 and S2 of the Metro del Vallès commuter rail system. All these lines are operated by Ferrocarrils de la Generalitat de Catalunya, who also run the station.

Sarrià station is the junction point between Barcelona Metro line L6 to Reina Elisenda, and the Metro del Vallès lines to Sant Cugat, Terrassa and Sabadell.

The station has four tracks, with three island platform between them, and three accesses. The western pair of tracks are used by L6 trains to and from Reina Elisenda, whilst the eastern pair are used by trains on lines S1 and S2. The two pairs of tracks join in a flat junction just to the south of the station.

The first Sarrià station opened in 1863 and was situated at ground level. The current station was opened in 1974. It's expected to become part of the central section of TMB double line L9 & L10.

See also
List of Barcelona Metro stations
List of railway stations in Barcelona

References

External links
 
 Information and photos about the station at Trenscat.com

Stations on the Barcelona–Vallès Line
Barcelona Metro line 6 stations
Barcelona Metro line 12 stations
Railway stations in Spain opened in 1863
Railway stations in Spain opened in 1974
Transport in Sarrià-Sant Gervasi
Railway stations located underground in Spain